Denville McKenzie (born 4 December 1975) is a Jamaican cricketer. He played in nine first-class and seven List A matches for the Jamaican cricket team from 1995 to 2001.

See also
 List of Jamaican representative cricketers

References

External links
 

1975 births
Living people
Jamaican cricketers
Jamaica cricketers
People from Westmoreland Parish